Nebojša Mihailović (born 13 April 1961) is a Serbian lawyer and former professional basketball player.

Basketball career

Playing career 
Mihailović grew up with the Crvena zvezda youth system, playing under coaches Mile Protić and Božidar Maljković.

As a professional player, Mihailović spent his entire professional career in Yugoslavia, playing for Crvena zvezda, Mladost Zemun, and OKK Beograd. He retired as a professional player with OKK Beograd in 1988 to start his legal career.

Post-playing career 
After retirement of professional career in 1988, Mihailović joined an amateur team KK Poštar.

Since June 2011, Mihailović has been a member of the Commission for Competitions at the Basketball Federation of Serbia, in charge for players' transfers and registrations.

Legal career 
Mihailović earned his law degree from the University of Belgrade Faculty of Law in 1985. In 1988, he pas the bar exam. At the same time he opened his own law firm and started his legal career as an attorney.

References

1961 births
Living people
Basketball players from Belgrade
Lawyers from Belgrade
KK Crvena zvezda players
KK Mladost Zemun players
OKK Beograd players
20th-century Serbian lawyers
Serbian men's basketball players
University of Belgrade Faculty of Law alumni
Yugoslav men's basketball players
21st-century Serbian lawyers